Saraswati Hi Tech City is a neighbourhood in Naini, Allahabad district, Uttar Pradesh, India. The area lies between the limits of Allahabad Municipality near Triveni Sangam river on NH 76. The Government of Uttar Pradesh is building a university named Allahabad State University, along with a library in Hi-tech city which also has a proposed stadium.

See also
Trans Ganga City

References

External links

Neighbourhoods in Allahabad